West Virginia Route 71 is a north–south state highway located within Mercer County, West Virginia. The southern terminus of the route is at U.S. Route 52 in Bluewell, north of Bluefield. The northern terminus is at West Virginia Route 10 in Matoaka.

Major intersections

References

071
Transportation in Mercer County, West Virginia